Oleksandr Dyachenko (born 1 March 1994) is a Ukrainian former football goalkeeper who last played for FC Rukh Vynnyky in the Ukrainian First League.

Dyachenko is product of youth team systems of FC Dynamo and FC Metalist. Made his debut for FC Obolon-Brovar Kyiv entering as a player in game against FC Real Pharma Ovidiopol on 6 September 2013 in Ukrainian Second League.

In November 2013, Dyachenko was called up for Ukraine national football team under-20 by coach Volodymyr Horilyi for training process .

He retired at age 24 after the latest injury when he broke his leg.

References

External links
Profile at PFL Official Site 
Profile at FFU Official Site 

1994 births
Living people
Footballers from Kyiv
Ukrainian footballers
FC Obolon-Brovar Kyiv players
FC Rukh Lviv players
Association football goalkeepers
Ukrainian First League players